Roy Stuart or Roy Stewart may refer to:

 Roy Stuart (actor)
 Roy Stuart (photographer)
 Roy Stuart (American football)
Roy Stewart, stuntman
Roy Stewart (silent film actor)
Roy Stewart (American football)
General Roy Stewart, a fictional character in the TV series Arrow